Johann Georg Rauch (1658, in Soultz-Haut-Rhin – 1710) was a German composer, and organist at Strasbourg Cathedral. His death was the occasion for the first performance of the Requiem of his colleague Franz Xaver Richter.

References

1658 births
1710 deaths
17th-century German composers
18th-century German composers